The following is a list of Danish artists nominated for MTV Europe Music Awards. List does not include MTV Europe Music Award for Best Danish Act, New Sounds of Europe, MTV Europe Music Award for Best Nordic Act or MTV Europe Music Award for Best European Act. Winners are in bold text.

MTV Europe Music Awards